"Barking" is a 2017 song by British rapper Ramz. It was released on 1 December 2017 as his debut single. The song entered the UK Singles Chart on 14 December 2017 at number 41, before peaking at number two on 19 January 2018.

A promotional music video, filmed around Waterloo, London and Barking, London, was uploaded to GRM Daily's YouTube channel on 17 September 2017.

Track listing

Charts

Weekly charts

Year-end charts

Certifications

References

2017 songs
2017 singles
Afroswing songs